Elmwood is a historic plantation house located near Merry Hill, Bertie County, North Carolina. It was built in two phases about 1787 and 1810. It is a two-story, seven-bay, transitional Georgian / Federal style frame dwelling.

It was added to the National Register of Historic Places in 2003.

References

Plantation houses in North Carolina
Houses on the National Register of Historic Places in North Carolina
Georgian architecture in North Carolina
Federal architecture in North Carolina
Houses completed in 1810
Houses in Bertie County, North Carolina
National Register of Historic Places in Bertie County, North Carolina